Tomáš Šmíd and Petr Korda were the defending champions, but Korda chose not to participate. Šmid partnered Karel Nováček, but lost in the first round to Ronnie Bathman and Rikard Bergh.

Luke Jensen and Laurie Warder won the title, defeating Paul Haarhuis and Mark Koevermans in the final, 5–7, 7–6(7–3), 6–4.

Seeds
The top four seeded teams received byes into the second round.

Draw

Finals

Top half

Bottom half

References

External links
 1991 Monte Carlo Open Doubles Draw

Doubles